Jamel Gurley Artis (born January 12, 1993) is an American professional basketball player for KB Trepça of the Kosovo Basketball Superleague. A native of Baltimore, he played college basketball for University of Pittsburgh.

College career
From Notre Dame Prep in Massachusetts, on April 12, 2013 he signed to play for the Pittsburgh Panthers. As a freshman, Artis played at power forward coming off the bench. Following the 2014–15 Atlantic Coast Conference men's basketball season, Artis was named All-ACC third team. Artis received All-ACC honorable mention honors as a senior.

Professional career

Orlando Magic (2017–2018)
After going undrafted in the 2017 NBA draft, Artis signed a partially guaranteed contract to join the New York Knicks' 2017 NBA Summer League roster on June 24, 2017. He averaged 8.8 points, 2.4 rebounds and 1.4 assists for 18 minutes per game through five games. On August 18, 2017, Artis signed with the New York Knicks. He was released during preseason training camp on October 4. Twelve days later, Artis agreed to a two-way contract with the Orlando Magic, meaning he's split some of his playing time this season between Orlando and their NBA G League affiliate, the Lakeland Magic. Artis would make his official NBA debut with Orlando on December 13, playing for a single minute in a 106–95 loss to the Los Angeles Clippers.

Agua Caliente Clippers (2018–2019)
On September 24, 2018, Artis signed with the Sacramento Kings for training camp. On October 7, 2018, Artis was waived by the Kings.

Levallois Metropolitans (2019–2020)
On July 3, 2019, Levallois Metropolitans announced that Artis joined them. He averaged 13.3 points, 4.1 rebounds and 1.7 assists per game.

BC Juventus (2020)
On September 21, 2020, Artis signed with BC Juventus of the Lithuanian Basketball League.

Chorale Roanne (2020–2021)
On December 25, 2020, he has signed with Chorale Roanne Basket of the LNB Pro A. In 26 games, he averaged 11.1 points, 2.7 rebounds, and 2.1 assists per game.

Kyoto Hannaryz (2021)
On August 31, 2021, Artis signed with Kyoto Hannaryz of the B.League.

Ionikos Nikaias (2021)
On September 29, 2021, Artis signed with Ionikos Nikaias of the Greek Basket League. On November 1, he was released from the Greek club.

NorthPort Batang Pier (2022)
On December 31, 2021, Artis joined the NorthPort Batang Pier of the Philippine Basketball Association (PBA) for the 2021 PBA Governors' Cup as a replacement for the injured Cameron Forte.

Cape Town Tigers (2022)
In April 2022, Artis was revealed to be on the roster of the Cape Town Tigers for the second season of the Basketball Africa League (BAL).

NBA career statistics

Regular season 

|-
| style="text-align:left;"| 
| style="text-align:left;"| Orlando
| 15 || 1 || 18.6 || .392 || .276 || .583 || 2.5 || 1.2 || .1 || .2 || 5.1
|-
| style="text-align:center;" colspan="2"| Career
| 15 || 1 || 18.6 || .392 || .276 || .583 || 2.5 || 1.2 || .1 || .2 || 5.1

References

External links

1993 births
Living people
21st-century African-American sportspeople
African-American basketball players
Agua Caliente Clippers players
American men's basketball players
American expatriate basketball people in France
American expatriate basketball people in Lithuania
American expatriate basketball people in the Philippines
Basketball players from Baltimore
Chorale Roanne Basket players
Lakeland Magic players
Orlando Magic players
Metropolitans 92 players
NorthPort Batang Pier players
Philippine Basketball Association imports
Pittsburgh Panthers men's basketball players
Shooting guards
Small forwards
Undrafted National Basketball Association players
Cape Town Tigers players
American expatriate basketball people in South Africa